Joy Ngozi Ezeilo is a Nigerian legal scholar.  She founded Women Aid Collective (WACOL), Tamar Sexual Assault Referral Centre and the West African Women’s Rights Coalition (WAWORC).  Professor Ezeilo is an activist and a scholar. She is the 2019 winner of the National Human Rights Award in Nigeria and recipient of the National Honour of Officer of the Order of Niger (OON) for her activism and contribution to human development. She is currently the Deputy Chairperson of the African Women’s Leadership Network (AWLN) Nigerian chapter and also a Member of the Enugu State Judicial Panel of Inquiry on Police Brutality and Extra-Judicial Killings. She was honored as one of the BBC 100 Women in 2022.

References

Living people
Year of birth missing (living people)
People from Enugu State
Igbo lawyers
Academic staff of the University of Nigeria
Officers of the Order of the Niger
United Nations special rapporteurs
Nigerian women lawyers
BBC 100 Women